Established in 1908, the Stockton Terminal and Eastern Railroad  provides service to several companies around the Stockton area, in San Joaquin County, California.

OmniTRAX acquired the ST&E in 2011.

Service

The railroad operates  of track connecting with the BNSF Railway, the Union Pacific Railroad, and the Central California Traction Company (CCT).

Being located in Stockton places the STE in a good situation for the consolidation and distribution of freight for companies in the region.  The companies include PDM Steel, Mizkan, and the Salt River Materials Group. The Port of Stockton is served by the connecting Central California Traction Company (CCT)

History
The company was established in 1908, and the railway line between Stockton and Bellota began operating in 1910. Lacking money to build an electrification system, the company purchased a steam locomotive for operations.

Legacy

The Stockton Terminal and Eastern locomotive No. 1 is on display at the Travel Town Museum in Griffith Park, located in Los Angeles, California.

See also 

List of California Interurban Railroads

References

External links 
 Official Stockton Terminal and Eastern website
 Central California Rails.net: Stockton Terminal and Eastern Railroad (ST&E)
 Uprr.com: Brief history of ST&E at UPRR

California railroads
Interurban railways in California
Economy of Stockton, California
OmniTRAX
Transportation in San Joaquin County, California
Railway companies established in 1908
1908 establishments in California